This is a list of defunct law firms. For list of current law firms, see list of law firms.

Canada

A
Armstrong Perkins Hudson LLP
F
Fraser Milner Casgrain
G
Goodman and Carr
Gowlings
H
Heenan Blaikie
Holden Day Wilson
L
Lang Michener
O
Ogilvy Renault

United Kingdom

A
ACS:Law
Addleshaw Booth & Co
B
Barlow Lyde & Gilbert
C
Cobbetts
D
Davenport Lyons
Denton Wilde Sapte
Dickinson Dees
G
Theodore Goddard
H
Halliwells
Hammonds
Herbert Smith
M
McGrigors
S
Semple Fraser
SNR Denton

United States

A
Altheimer & Gray
Arter & Hadden

B
Baker & Daniels
Bingham McCutchen
Brobeck, Phleger & Harrison
Brown & Wood
C
Community Rights Counsel
Coudert Brothers
D
Dewey & LeBoeuf
Dewey Ballantine
Dickstein Shapiro
Donovan, Leisure, Newton & Irvine
Dow Lohnes
F
Faegre & Benson
Finley, Kumble, Wagner, Underberg, Manley, Myerson & Casey
G
Gardner Carton & Douglas
Graham & James
H
Hall Dickler Kent Goldstein & Wood
Halleck, Peachy & Billings
Heller Ehrman
Hill and Barlow
Hopkins & Sutter
Howe and Hummel
Howrey
I
Isham Lincoln & Beale
J
Jenkens & Gilchrist
K
Katten Muchin & Zavis
Keck, Mahin & Cate
L
LeBoeuf, Lamb, Greene & MacRae
Lindquist & Vennum
Lord Day & Lord
Lyon & Lyon
M
Mudge Rose Guthrie Alexander & Ferdon
Myerson & Kuhn
P
Parker Chapin Flattau & Klimpl
Pennie & Edmonds
Preston Gates & Ellis
R
Rider Bennett
Robinson, Silverman, Pearce, Aronsohn, and Berman
Rogers & Wells
Rosenman & Colin
S
Shea & Gardner
Shea & Gould
Sonnenschein Nath & Rosenthal
Squadron, Ellenoff, Plesent & Sheinfeld
Steven J. Baum P.C.
Swidler Berlin Shereff Friedman
T
Testa, Hurwitz & Thibeault
Thacher Proffitt & Wood
Thelen LLP
Tillinghast Licht
Trevor Law Group
W
Waesche, Sheinbaum & O'Regan
Walter, Conston, Alexander & Green
Washington, Perito & Dubuc
Webster & Sheffield
Winthrop, Stimson, Putnam & Roberts
WolfBlock

References 

Defunct law firms